The 2020–21 Hong Kong Premier League (also known as the BOC Life Hong Kong Premier League for sponsorship reasons) is the seventh season of the Hong Kong Premier League, the top division of Hong Kong football.

Effects of the 2019–20 coronavirus pandemic 
Due to the 2020 coronavirus pandemic in Hong Kong, the Hong Kong Football Association postponed the opening of the 2020–21 season. Later, it was announced that the season would begin on 21 November 2020. The league was suspended again after two rounds being played due to the third wave of coronavirus pandemic in Hong Kong. On 12 February 2021, the Hong Kong Leisure and Cultural Services Department approved to resume football competitions in Hong Kong after February 20 behind closed doors. The Senior Shied and FA Cup were cancelled, while the ongoing Sapling Cup would continue.

Teams 
A total of eight teams contest the league, including seven sides from the 2019–20 Hong Kong Premier League and one promoted from the 2019–20 Hong Kong First Division. Tai Po and Yuen Long decided to self-relegate to the Hong Kong First Division due to lack of funds. Meanwhile, R&F decided to withdraw from the league system.

Pink denotes a newly promoted club entering the league this year.

Stadia and locations 

Primary venues used in the Hong Kong Premier League:

Personnel and kits

Managerial changes

Foreign players 
The number of foreign players is restricted to six per team, with no more than five on the pitch during matches, the fifth player must be a marquee player.

According to the decision made by Hong Kong Football Association Board of Directors on 15 July 2020, the marquee player must fulfil one of the following criteria: 

i) played for a club which is in a world's top professional league of one of the top 50 associations in the FIFA ranking published by FIFA on 11 June 2020 for at least 1 season or ii) fielded by his association in an international match, which his association is one of the top 50 associations in the FIFA ranking published by FIFA on 11 June 2020.

League table

Results

Championship Group

Relegation Group

Positions by round 
To preserve chronological evolvements, any postponed matches are not included to the round at which they were originally scheduled, but added to the full round they were played immediately afterwards. For example, if a match is scheduled for round 7, but then played between rounds 8 and 9, it will be added to the standings for round 8.

Championship Group

Relegation Group

Fixtures and results

Round 1

Round 2

Round 3

Round 4

Round 5

Round 6

Round 7

Round 8

Round 9

Round 10

Round 11

Round 12

Round 13

Round 14

Round 15

Round 16

Round 17

Season statistics

Top scorers

Hat-tricks 
Note: The results column shows the scorer's team score first. Teams in bold are home teams.

Clean sheets

Attendances

Awards

Monthly Most Valuable Player

Hong Kong Top Footballer Awards

Remarks

References 

Hong Kong Premier League seasons
Hong Kong
2020–21 in Hong Kong football
Hong Kong Premier League